Tarazu is an Indian action thriller movie directed by Vimal Kumar and released in 1997 under the banner of Vee Creations. It stars mainly Akshay Kumar, Sonali Bendre, Amrish Puri, Ranjeet and Mohnish Bahl.

Plot 
Police Inspector Ram Yadav (Akshay Kumar) is an honest, handsome, and incorruptible young man. He lives with his sister-in-law, Shakuntala (Shashi Sharma), and elder brother, Raj (Anil Dhawan). A lovely yet petty thief, Pooja (Sonali Bendre) admires Ram so much that she moves into his house in the guise of a maid-servant, and eventually claims that she is to bear his child. Ram, unable to handle this, agrees to marry her. His duties and investigation lead him to suspect the influential Appa Rao (Amrish Puri). Appa Rao is enraged at Ram, and watches and waits for an opportunity to strike back at him. Janardan (Mohnish Behl), Appa Rao's spoiled and wayward son, initially attempts to pick up a college girl. When she refuses and humiliates him publicly, he retaliates by setting her on fire in broad daylight, in front of several college students. No one is bold enough to stop Janardan, nor even attempt to save the girl. When Ram finds out, he immediately arrests Janardan and holds him in custody. This enrages Appa Rao even more, and he schemes against Ram, a plot so devilish that will turn Ram's ordered life, his faith in the justice, and law of the country, upside down.

Characters 
 Akshay Kumar as Inspector Ram Yadav
 Sonali Bendre as Pooja
 Mohnish Bahl as Janardan (Appa Rao's son)
 Ranjeet as Police Commissioner
 Tej Sapru as Inspector Kulkarni
 Harish Patel as Appa Rao Lawyer
 Kader Khan as Dr. Khan
 Amrish Puri as Appa Rao
 Dinesh Hingoo as Mulchand
 Anil Nagarath as Defence Lawyer
 Shashi Sharma as Shakuntala

Soundtrack 
The music was directed by Rajesh Roshan. "Haseena Gori Gori" is copied from In the Summertime by Mungo Jerry.

References

External links 
 

1997 films
1990s Hindi-language films
Films scored by Rajesh Roshan
Indian crime action films
Films directed by Vimal Kumar